Elizabeth Anne Holmes (born February 3, 1984) is a convicted American fraudster and former biotechnology entrepreneur. In 2003, Holmes founded and was the chief executive officer (CEO) of Theranos, a now-defunct health technology company. It soared in valuation after the company claimed to have revolutionized blood testing by developing methods that could use surprisingly small volumes of blood, such as from a fingerprick. By 2015, Forbes had named Holmes the youngest and wealthiest self-made female billionaire in the United States on the basis of a $9-billion valuation of her company. In the following year, as revelations of potential fraud about Theranos's claims began to surface, Forbes revised its estimate of Holmes's net worth to zero, and Fortune named her in its feature article on "The World's 19 Most Disappointing Leaders".

The decline of Theranos began in 2015, when a series of journalistic and regulatory investigations revealed doubts about the company's technology claims and whether Holmes had misled investors and the government. In 2018, the U.S. Securities and Exchange Commission (SEC) charged Theranos and Holmes with deceiving investors by "massive fraud" through false or exaggerated claims about the accuracy of the company's blood-testing technology; Holmes settled the charges by paying a $500,000 fine, returning 18.9 million shares to the company, relinquishing her voting control of Theranos, and accepting a ten-year ban from serving as an officer or director of a public company.

In June 2018, a federal grand jury indicted Holmes and former Theranos chief operating officer (COO) Ramesh "Sunny" Balwani on fraud charges. Her trial in the case of U.S. v. Holmes, et al. ended in January 2022 when Holmes was convicted of defrauding investors, and acquitted of defrauding patients. In November 2022, she was sentenced to serve  years in prison.

The credibility of Theranos was attributed in part to Holmes's personal connections and ability to recruit the support of influential people, including Henry Kissinger, George Shultz, Jim Mattis, and Betsy DeVos, all of whom had served or would go on to serve as U.S. presidential cabinet officials. Holmes was in a clandestine romantic relationship with Balwani during most of Theranos's history. Following the collapse of Theranos, she started dating hotel heir Billy Evans, with whom she had a son in 2021.

Theranos and Holmes's career are the subject of a book, Bad Blood: Secrets and Lies in a Silicon Valley Startup (2018), by The Wall Street Journal reporter John Carreyrou; an HBO documentary film, The Inventor: Out for Blood in Silicon Valley (2019); a true crime podcast, The Dropout; and a Hulu miniseries based on the podcast, The Dropout (2022).

Early life

Elizabeth Holmes was born February 3, 1984, in Washington, D.C. Her father, Christian Rasmus Holmes IV, was a vice president at Enron, an energy company that later went bankrupt after an accounting fraud scandal. Her mother, Noel Anne (née Daoust), worked as a Congressional committee staffer. Christian later held executive positions in government agencies such as USAID, the EPA, and USTDA. Christian is of part Danish ancestry. One of her paternal great-great-great-grandfathers was Charles Louis Fleischmann, a Hungarian immigrant who founded the Fleischmann's Yeast company. The Holmes family "was very proud of its yeast empire" history, according to a family friend Joseph Fuisz, "I think the parents very much yearned for the days of yore when the family was one of the richest in America. And I think Elizabeth channeled that, and at a young age."

Holmes graduated high school from St. John's School in Houston. During high school, she was interested in computer programming and says she started her first business selling C++ compilers to Chinese universities. Her parents had arranged Mandarin Chinese home tutoring, and partway through high school, Holmes began attending Stanford University's summer Mandarin program. In 2002, Holmes attended Stanford, where she studied chemical engineering and worked as a student researcher and laboratory assistant in the School of Engineering.

After the end of her freshman year, Holmes worked in a laboratory at the Genome Institute of Singapore and tested for severe acute respiratory syndrome coronavirus (SARS-CoV-1) through the collection of blood samples with syringes. She filed her first patent application on a wearable drug-delivery patch in 2003. Holmes reported that she was raped at Stanford in 2003.In March 2004, she dropped out of Stanford's School of Engineering and used her tuition money as seed funding for a consumer healthcare technology company.

Theranos

Founding
In 2003, Holmes founded the company Real-Time Cures in Palo Alto, California, to "democratize healthcare". Holmes described her fear of needles as a motivation and sought to perform blood tests using only small amounts of blood. When Holmes pitched the idea to reap "vast amounts of data from a few droplets of blood derived from the tip of a finger" to her medicine professor Phyllis Gardner at Stanford, Gardner responded, "I don't think your idea is going to work", explaining it was impossible to do what Holmes was claiming could be done. Several other expert medical professors told Holmes the same thing. However, Holmes did not relent, and she succeeded in getting her advisor and dean at the School of Engineering, Channing Robertson, to back her idea.

In 2003, Holmes renamed the company Theranos (a portmanteau of "therapy" and "diagnosis"). Robertson became the company's first board member and introduced Holmes to venture capitalists.

Holmes was an admirer of Apple founder Steve Jobs, and deliberately copied his style, frequently dressing in a black turtleneck sweater, as Jobs did. Holmes says her mother dressed her in black turtlenecks when she was young and that she had worn the turtlenecks beginning around the age of eight, but an employee says she suggested copying Jobs's famous Issey Miyake turtleneck look in 2007.

During most of her public appearances, she spoke in a deep baritone voice, although a former Theranos colleague later claimed he heard her speak in a voice stereotypical of a woman her age to welcome him when he was hired. Gardner of Stanford also denies that Holmes has a naturally deep voice. Her family, however, has maintained that her deep voice is authentic.

Funding and expansion
By December 2004, Holmes had raised $6 million to fund the firm. By the end of 2010, Theranos had more than $92 million in venture capital. In July 2011, Holmes was introduced to former secretary of state George Shultz. After a two-hour meeting, he joined the Theranos board of directors. Holmes was recognized for forming "the most illustrious board in U.S. corporate history" over the next three years.

Holmes operated Theranos in "stealth mode" without press releases or a company website until September 2013, when the company announced a partnership with Walgreens to launch in-store blood sample collection centers. She was interviewed for Medscape by its editor-in-chief, Eric Topol, who praised her for "this phenomenal rebooting of laboratory medicine". Media attention increased in 2014, when Holmes appeared on the covers of Fortune, Forbes, T: The New York Times Style Magazine, and Inc. Forbes recognized Holmes as the world's youngest self-made female billionaire and ranked her #110 on the Forbes 400 in 2014. Theranos was valued at $9 billion and had raised more than $400 million in venture capital. By the end of 2014, her name appeared on 18 U.S. patents and 66 foreign patents. During 2015, Holmes established agreements with Cleveland Clinic, Capital BlueCross, and AmeriHealth Caritas to use Theranos technology.

Downfall
John Carreyrou of The Wall Street Journal initiated a secret, months-long investigation of Theranos after he received a tip from a medical expert who thought that Theranos's Edison blood testing device seemed suspicious. Carreyrou spoke to ex-employee whistleblowers and obtained company documents. When Holmes learned of the investigation, she initiated a campaign through her lawyer David Boies to stop Carreyrou from publishing, which included legal and financial threats against both the Journal and the whistleblowers.

In October 2015, despite Boies's legal threats and strong-arm tactics, the Journal published Carreyrou's "bombshell article" detailing how the Edison device gave inaccurate results, and revealing that the company had been using commercially available machines manufactured by other companies for most of its testing. Carreyrou continued to report problems with the company and Holmes's conduct in a series of articles and, in 2018, published a book titled Bad Blood: Secrets and Lies in a Silicon Valley Startup, detailing his investigation of Theranos.

Holmes denied all the claims, calling the Journal a "tabloid" and promising the company would publish data on the accuracy of its tests. She appeared on CNBC's Mad Money the same evening the article was published. Jim Cramer said, "The article was pretty brutal", to which Holmes responded, "This is what happens when you work to change things, first they think you're crazy, then they fight you, and then all of a sudden you change the world."

In January 2016, the Centers for Medicare and Medicaid Services (CMS) sent a warning letter to Theranos after an inspection of its Newark, California, laboratory uncovered irregularities with staff proficiency, procedures, and equipment. CMS regulators proposed a two-year ban on Holmes from owning or operating a certified clinical laboratory after the company had not fixed problems in its California lab in March 2016. On The Today Show, Holmes said she was "devastated we did not catch and fix these issues faster" and said the lab would be rebuilt with help from a new scientific and medical advisory board.

In July 2016, CMS banned Holmes from owning, operating, or directing a blood-testing service for a period of two years. Theranos appealed that decision to a U.S. Department of Health and Human Services appeals board.  Shortly thereafter, Walgreens ended its relationship with Theranos and closed its in-store blood collection centers. The U.S. Food and Drug Administration (FDA) also ordered the company to cease use of its Capillary Tube Nanotainer device, one of its core inventions.

In 2017, the State of Arizona filed suit against Theranos, alleging that the company had sold 1.5 million blood tests to Arizonans while concealing or misrepresenting important facts about those tests. In April 2017, the company settled the lawsuit by agreeing to refund the cost of the tests to consumers, and to pay $225,000 in civil fines and attorney fees, for a total of $4.65 million. Other reported ongoing actions include an unspecified investigation by the U.S. Federal Bureau of Investigation (FBI) and two class action fraud lawsuits. Holmes denied any wrongdoing.

On May 16, 2017, approximately 99 percent of Theranos shareholders reached an agreement with the company to dismiss all current and potential litigation in exchange for shares of preferred stock.  Holmes released a portion of her equity to offset any dilution of stock value to non-participating shareholders.

In March 2018, the SEC charged Holmes and Theranos's former president, Ramesh Balwani, with fraud by taking more than $700 million from investors while advertising a false product. On March 14, 2018, Holmes settled an SEC lawsuit. The charges of fraud included the company's false claim that its technology was being used by the U.S. Department of Defense in combat situations. The company also lied when it claimed to have a $100 million revenue stream in 2014. That year, the company only made $100,000. The terms of Holmes's settlement included surrendering voting control of Theranos, returning 18.9 million shares to the company, a ban on holding an officer or director position in a public company for 10 years, and a $500,000 fine.

At its height in 2015, Theranos had more than 800 employees. It dismissed 340 people in October 2016 and an additional 155 in January 2017. In April 2018, Theranos filed a WARN Act notice with the State of California, announcing its plans to permanently lay off 105 employees, leaving it with fewer than two dozen employees. Most of the remaining employees were laid off in August 2018. On September 5, 2018, the company announced that it had begun the process of formally dissolving, with its remaining cash and assets to be distributed to its creditors.

U.S. v. Holmes, et al. 

On June 15, 2018, following an investigation by the U.S. Attorney's Office for the Northern District of California in San Francisco that lasted more than two years, a federal grand jury indicted Holmes and former Theranos chief operating officer and president, Ramesh "Sunny" Balwani, on nine counts of wire fraud and two counts of conspiracy to commit wire fraud. Both pleaded not guilty. Prosecutors allege that Holmes and Balwani engaged in two criminal schemes, one to defraud investors, the other to defraud doctors and patients. After the indictment was issued, Holmes stepped down as CEO of Theranos but remained chair of the board.

Holmes was tried in the U.S. District Court for the Northern District of California, with U.S. district judge Edward Davila presiding. Holmes retained defense lawyers from Williams & Connolly, a prominent American law firm that specializes in white-collar crime defense. The trial began on August 31, 2021, after being delayed for over a year due to the COVID-19 pandemic and Holmes's pregnancy. The case was prosecuted by the United States Attorney for the Northern District of California. Holmes testified in self-defense for seven days, claiming among other things that she was misled by her staff about the technology, and that her ex-romantic partner Sunny Balwani, who was also facing trial, held influence over her during the romantic relationship they had and which was still ongoing when the alleged criminal acts happened. The case's evidence outlined Holmes's role in faked demonstrations, falsified validation reports, misleading claims about contracts, and overstated financials at Theranos.

On January 3, 2022, Holmes was found guilty on four counts of defrauding investors three counts of wire fraud, and one of conspiracy to commit wire fraud. She was found not guilty on four counts of defrauding patients three counts of wire fraud and one of conspiracy to commit wire fraud. The jury returned a "no verdict" on three counts of wire fraud against investors the judge declared a mistrial on those counts and the government soon after agreed to dismiss them. Holmes waited on sentencing while remaining 'at liberty' on $500,000 bail, secured with property. She faced a maximum sentence of 20 years in prison, and a fine of $250,000, plus restitution, for each count of wire fraud and for each conspiracy count. 

On November 18, 2022, U.S. District Judge Edward Davila sentenced Holmes to  years (135 months) in prison, and ordered her to surrender by April 27, 2023. The sentence included a fine of $400, or $100 for each count of fraud, and a three-year supervised release after the prison term. She could get about a 15% reduction on prison time with good behavior, which would put her sentence at  years with no possibility for parole. Davila recommended she be incarcerated at Federal Prison Camp, Bryan, in Texas, a minimum security facility with limited or no perimeter fencing. "No one wants to get kicked out because compared to other places in the prison system, this place is heaven. If you have to go it's a good place to go," said a criminal defense lawyer.

After her conviction, Holmes and her partner allegedly attempted to flee, according to prosecutors, when they bought one-way plane tickets to Mexico. Holmes's legal team said they bought the tickets with the hope the outcome of the case would have been different, and that she canceled her ticket after losing the case; her partner went on to Mexico without her.

Promotional activities
Holmes partnered with Carlos Slim in June 2015 to improve blood testing in Mexico. In October 2015, she announced #IronSisters to help women in science, technology, engineering, and mathematics careers. In 2015, she helped to draft and pass a law in Arizona to let people obtain and pay for lab tests without requiring insurance or healthcare provider approval, while misrepresenting the accuracy and effectiveness of the Theranos device.

Connections
Theranos's board and investors included many influential figures. Holmes's first major investor was Tim Draper – Silicon Valley venture capitalist and father of Holmes's childhood friend Jesse Draper – who "cut Holmes a check" for $1 million upon hearing her initial pitch for the firm that would become Theranos. Theranos's pool of major investors expanded to include Rupert Murdoch, the Walton family, the DeVos family including Betsy DeVos, the Cox family of Cox Enterprises and Carlos Slim Helú. Each of these investors lost tens to hundreds of millions of dollars when Theranos folded.

One of Holmes's first board members was George Shultz. With Shultz's early involvement aiding Holmes's recruitment efforts, the 12-member Theranos board eventually included: Henry Kissinger, a former secretary of state; William Perry, a former secretary of defense; James Mattis, a future secretary of defense; Gary Roughead, a retired U.S. Navy admiral; Bill Frist, a former U.S. senator (R-TN); Sam Nunn, a former U.S. senator (D-GA); and former CEOs Dick Kovacevich of Wells Fargo and Riley Bechtel of Bechtel.

Recognition
Before the collapse of Theranos, Holmes received widespread acclaim. In 2015, she was appointed a member of the Harvard Medical School Board of Fellows and was named one of Time magazine's "Time 100 most influential people". Holmes received the Under 30 Doers Award from Forbes and was ranked number 73 in its 2015 list of "the world's most powerful women". She was also named Woman of the Year by Glamour and received an Honorary Doctor of Humane Letters from Pepperdine University. Holmes was awarded the 2015 Horatio Alger Award of the Horatio Alger Association of Distinguished Americans, making her its youngest recipient in history. She previously had been named Fortunes Businessperson of the Year and had been listed in its 40 Under 40 feature. In 2015 she was a member of Bloomberg's 50 Most Influential. 

In 2016, Fortune named Holmes in its article on "The World's 19 Most Disappointing Leaders".

Personal life

Holmes was romantically involved with technology entrepreneur Ramesh "Sunny" Balwani, a Pakistani-born Hindu who immigrated to India and then the US. She met him in 2002 during a trip to Beijing as part of  Stanford University's Mandarin program. Holmes was 18 at the time and had just graduated from high school; Balwani is 19 years older than she is and was married to another woman at the time.

Balwani divorced his wife in 2002 and became romantically involved with Holmes in 2003, about the same time Holmes dropped out of university. The couple moved into an apartment together in 2005. Although Balwani did not officially join Theranos until 2009, when he was given the title of chief operating officer, he was advising Holmes behind the scenes from the company's inception. Holmes and Balwani jointly ran the company with a corporate culture of "secrecy and fear" according to employees. Their romantic relationship was kept secret for much of their time running the company. Balwani left Theranos in 2016 in the wake of investigations. The circumstances of his departure are unclear; Holmes has stated that she fired him, but Balwani says that he left of his own accord.

On November 29, 2021, Holmes testified that she had been raped while she was a student at Stanford and that she sought solace from Balwani in the aftermath of the incident. She also said Balwani was very controlling during their romantic relationship, which lasted more than a decade, and at times he berated and sexually abused her. In her testimony, she stated he also wanted to "kill the person" she was and create a "new Elizabeth".  However, she also testified that Balwani had not forced her to make the false statements to investors, business partners, journalists and company directors that had been described in the case. In court filings, Balwani has "categorically" denied abuse allegations, calling them "false and inflammatory."

Before the March 2018 settlement, Holmes owned half of Theranos's stock. Forbes listed her as one of America's Richest Self-Made Women in 2015 with a net worth of $4.5 billion. In June 2016, Forbes released an updated valuation of $800 million for Theranos, which made Holmes's stake essentially worthless, because other investors owned preferred shares and would have been paid before Holmes, who owned only common stock. Holmes reportedly owed a $25 million debt to Theranos in connection with exercising stock options. She did not receive any company cash from the arrangement, nor did she sell any of her shares, including those associated with the debt.

In early 2019, Holmes became engaged to William "Billy" Evans, a 27-year-old heir to Evans Hotels, a family-owned group of hotels in the San Diego area. In mid-2019, Holmes and Evans reportedly married in a private ceremony. Holmes and Evans have not directly confirmed whether the two are legally married, and several sources continue to refer to him as her "partner" rather than her husband. They live in San Francisco. Holmes gave birth to a son in July 2021. In October 2022, weeks before her sentencing hearing, it was reported she was pregnant again. Holmes gave birth to a second child according to a court filing from February 2023 as part of an argument for delaying the start of her prison term.

In January 2022, NPR obtained a copy of a partial police report from the evening of October 5, 2003, in which Holmes called the police and alleged she was sexually assaulted at a fraternity house at Stanford between 1 a.m. and 3 a.m. that morning. The police report supported claims made by Holmes during the trial, in which she said: "I was questioning how I was going to be able to process that [rape] experience and what I wanted to do with my life, and I decided that I was going to build a life by building [a company]." She had started Theranos later that year. The report written by the deputies who responded to the call was withheld from release, and the partial information obtained by NPR does not identify an alleged perpetrator or other details about the incident, but identifies the street address of the Sigma Chi fraternity house as the location.

In the media

The case of Holmes is said to have created a stigma for other women entrepreneurs, particularly in the sciences and health care industries, who are often compared to her. Writing in The New York Times, technology journalist Erin Griffith commented that "Holmes continues to loom large across the start-up world because of the audacity of her story, which has permeated popular culture," with women entrepreneurs reporting that "the frequent comparisons [to Holmes] are pernicious". Investor and executive Ellen Pao wrote in a New York Times opinion piece that Holmes was singled out because of "sexism", and that her trial was a "wake-up call for sexism in tech."

Holmes has been featured in a number of media works:

In June 2016, Deadline Hollywood first reported that Jennifer Lawrence would play Holmes, in a film directed by Adam McKay, adapted from John Carreyrou's then-unpublished book Bad Blood: Secrets and Lies in a Silicon Valley Startup. In December 2021, The Hollywood Reporter reported that the film would be produced and distributed by Apple Studios, with Legendary Pictures co-producing. In November 2022, Jennifer Lawrence called off the film after seeing Amanda Seyfried's Emmy Award winning portrayal in The Dropout, saying she didn't see the point, "I was like, 'Yeah, we don't need to redo that.' She did it."
 In May 2018, author John Carreyrou released the book Bad Blood: Secrets and Lies in a Silicon Valley Startup, describing the life of Holmes and the inner workings of Theranos. The film rights to Carreyrou's book were purchased by Legendary nearly two years before the book was published. 
 In January 2019, ABC News, Nightline, and Rebecca Jarvis released a podcast and documentary about the Holmes story called The Dropout. It included interviews and deposition tapes of key figures, including Elizabeth Holmes, Sunny Balwani, Christian Holmes (Elizabeth's brother), Tyler Shultz (Theranos whistleblower and grandson of Board Member George Shultz), Theranos board members Bill Frist, Gary Roughead, Robert Kovacevichz and others. The series also featured an interview with Jeff Coopersmith, the attorney representing Balwani.
 On March 18, 2019, HBO premiered the documentary The Inventor: Out for Blood in Silicon Valley, a two-hour documentary film first shown at the Sundance Film Festival on January 24, 2019. It portrays the claims and promises made by Holmes in the last years of Theranos and how ultimately the company was brought down by the weight of many falsehoods. The documentary ends in 2018, with Holmes and Balwani indicted for multiple crimes.
In June 2021, Season 7, episode 12 of the US comedy-drama Younger features a musical number about famous scammers, in which Elizabeth Stanley portrays Holmes.
On August 8, 2021, the Australian newsmagazine 60 Minutes featured the Theranos story and Holmes's upcoming trial.
In March 2022, Hulu released The Dropout, a miniseries based on the podcast of the same name. The series starred Amanda Seyfried as Holmes, a role for which she received a Primetime Emmy Award and a Golden Globe Award.

References

Notes

Works cited

Further reading

External links

 USPTO list of granted U.S. patents listing Holmes as an inventor (120 patents as of January 4, 2022)
 
 
 
 
 
 

1984 births
21st-century American businesswomen
21st-century American businesspeople
21st-century American criminals
21st-century American inventors
American company founders
American confidence tricksters
American female criminals
American health care chief executives
American people convicted of fraud
American people of Danish descent
American people of French-Canadian descent
American people of Hungarian-Jewish descent
American women chief executives
American women company founders
Confidence tricksters
Businesspeople from Houston
Businesspeople from Washington, D.C.
Former billionaires
Health fraud
Living people
St. John's School (Texas) alumni
Stanford University alumni
Theranos people
Women inventors